In Hong Kong, localism is a political movement centered on the preservation of the city's autonomy and local culture. The Hong Kong localist movement encompasses a variety of groups with different goals, but all of them oppose the perceived growing encroachment of the Chinese central government on the city's management of its own political, economic, and social affairs. Issues of concern to localist groups include land use and development, cultural and heritage conservation on the left, parallel trading and the increasing number of mainland immigrants and tourists on the right. On the autonomy of Hong Kong, many of them advocate the Hong Kong people's right to self-determination, while milder elements advocate for greater autonomy while remaining part of China, and the most radical call for return to British rule or full independence as a sovereign state. Certain right-wing localist groups also advocate for a more aggressive and militant approach in defending popular interests.

Though localist groups with different agendas and ideologies have existed since the territory's transfer of sovereignty, today's movement as a whole emerged in the early 2010s and gained significant traction following widespread protests in 2014 against the Chinese government's decision to pre-screen Chief Executive candidates before allowing them to be chosen by the general public in a 2017 election. Following these protests, a number of localist political parties were formed, organising protests and participating in Legislative Council elections. In the 2016 Legislative Council election, localist candidates won 6 of the 35 seats allocated for geographical constituencies, earning a 19 per cent share of total votes. After the election, the government took legal actions against the localist and the radical democrat legislators over the oath-taking controversy, which resulted in the disqualifications of six legislators, and furthermore, the disqualification of the candidacies of the accused "pro-independence" localist candidates.

Terminology
Localism in the western context constitutes libertarian ideas of a decentralised local government as opposed to the central government, and stresses on self-sufficiency, agriculture and communalism. Although it also stresses Hong Kong's economic self-sufficiency and local democracy, in the Hong Kong context, localism emphasises the mainland Chinese cultural and political threat to the city and attempts to reinforce a Hong Kong identity as opposed to the Chinese national identity. It often includes an anti-immigration stance especially in the right-wing rhetoric, and it has been said that "nativism" is synonymous with localism. Some localists call themselves "autonomists", while the Beijing government brands them "separatists".

History of local consciousness in Hong Kong
Hong Kong was established in 1841 as a free port. The colonial government encouraged the free movement of capital and labour and there was not a strict sense of "Hong Kong residents" or "Hong Kong people". Residents were not registered by the government until 1949, a response to the influx of refugees fleeing from the Communists' takeover in Mainland China.

Sociologist Lui Tai-lok in his book Four Generations of Hong Kong People, divided Hong Kong people into four generations. The first generation, he states, was the ones who were born before 1945 and had experienced the Japanese occupation of Hong Kong, while the baby boomers, the second generation who were born after the war, were the first wave of local consciousness.

First wave
The baby boomers were children of the refugees but were born and raised in Hong Kong and have a strong sense of belonging. They sought to break through the Cold War rivalry between the Communists and the Nationalists which dominated the political scene at the time.

There were few advocates for decolonisation of Hong Kong from the British rule during the post-war period, notably Ma Man-fai and the Democratic Self-Government Party of Hong Kong in the 1960s. The 1970s saw unprecedented waves of student movements, such as the Chinese Language Movement and the anti-corruption movement, the defend the Diaoyu Islands movement, and so on, which were independent of the left-right spectrum and became the first wave of local consciousness. The Chinese Language Movement succeeded in having Chinese join English as an official language of Hong Kong. The student movements at the time consisted of some liberal, Chinese nationalist, and anti-colonialist elements.

In the 1960s and 70s, the colonial government also attempted to create an apolitical local consciousness in order to boost the legitimacy of the colonial rule. Under Governor Murray MacLehose's administration, Hong Kong underwent a massive decolonisation reform. The aim of creating a local identity was to raise the bid for the British side in the upcoming negotiation over Hong Kong sovereignty after 1997. The British government also carefully avoided increasing the Hong Kong people's sense of Britishness as it had already decided to prevent massive migration from Hong Kong to Britain.

Second wave

The second wave of local consciousness emerged in the 1990s as colonial rule was coming to an end. The 1989 Tiananmen massacre sparked massive local protest and fear about looming Communist rule. The local cultural scene responded by consolidating enthusiasm about distinctive features as well as diversity of Hong Kong culture and identity. It cited post-colonial theory, rejecting Sinocentric chauvinism and promoting the cosmopolitanism of Hong Kong as an international city, together with liberal ideals of inclusiveness, diversity and trans-nationality. It also emphasised the importance of universal values, a diverse civil society, civic education, press and academic freedoms after 1997. In the late 1980s, established politicians, most notably Anson Chan, Chung Sze-yuen and the UMELCO, sought to voice the concerns on the behalf of the Hong Kong people in discussions between the Chinese and British governments. This, however, was unfruitful and saw Hong Kong's sovereignty transferred to the PRC in 1997.

Third wave

The 1 July 2003 march recorded an estimated 500,000 to 700,000 people demonstrating against the government's proposed anti-sedition legislation, the largest protest since the 1989 Tiananmen Square protest. Many post-80s (the generation who were born in the 1980s, Millennials in western terminology) were inspired by the democracy movement and came out onto the streets. 7.1 People Pile was one of the groups which emerged after the protest. They were upset by rapid urban development which was sweeping away old neighbourhoods and communities. They were strongly opposed to the political and economic monopoly of vested interests, collusion between business and government, and questioned the nature of the capitalist system in Hong Kong.

They were also dissatisfied with the established opposition pro-democracy camp, which they considered ineffective in challenging the system. Several conservation movements led by young activists emerged, protesting against demolition of the Edinburgh Place Ferry Pier, Queen's Pier, and the buildings on Lee Tung Street (known as "Wedding Card Street") in 2006 and 2007. Protests against the construction of the Hong Kong section of the high-speed rail link to Guangzhou (XRL) escalated in 2009 and 2010 and established a new high point of the localist movement.

Rise of contemporary localism

Chin Wan's city-statism
The failure of the peaceful anti-XRL protests damaged the reputation of the left-leaning moderate activists. Some turned to a more radical approach. Scholar Chin Wan published the book, On the Hong Kong City-State in 2011 which triggered fierce public debate and was popular among the young generation. In the book, Chin suggests abandoning the hope for a democratic China and positions the democracy movement in a "localist" perspective, in order to counter Beijing's "neo-imperialist" policies toward Hong Kong. It analysed the potential threat of the influx of mainland tourists and immigrants to the established institutions and social customs of Hong Kong, which he considered likely part of a colonisation scheme by Beijing, including the increasing use of Mandarin Chinese and Simplified Chinese in daily use and in schools.

He advocates "Hong Kong First" and "Hong Kong-China separation" positions in order to protect Hong Kong from "cultural genocide", arguing that Hongkong was already highly autonomous under Britain, and had formed its own identity with the preserved Chinese culture joining with British culture and more. He suggested consolidating Hong Kong into a fully autonomous city-state Chin's view was largely accepted by Hong Kong independence advocates and those who advocate for the restoration of British rule in Hong Kong.

Since then, it has created a diversification in Hong Kong's political discussion, from reinterpreting colonial history, nostalgia for British rule, to cherishing historical or current Hong Kong culture, and various forms of anti-Chinese sentiment through different ideologies like anti-communism, Confucianism, Taoism, constitutionalism, liberalism, socialism and more. He once joined the group Hong Kong Autonomy Movement. After leaving the HKAM group, he set up his own autonomist group called the Hong Kong Resurgence Order. Another group inspired by Chin's idea called the Hong Kong Nativism Power was set up in 2011. They protested against the inclusion of non-Hong Kong permanent residents in the HK$6,000 cash handouts program as demanded by new immigrants support groups and called for a revision of the current immigration policy.

Hong Kong–Mainland conflict

Many conflicts between Mainlanders and Hongkongers also occurred due to the influx of the tourists and immigrants, such as the Dolce & Gabbana controversy, the Kong Qingdong incident, birth tourism, and parallel trading among mainland tourists, among others. These incidents and issues intensified the anti-Chinese sentiment among the Hong Kong public. Some of them published an advertisement in local newspapers, calling Mainlanders "locusts" who steal resources from Hongkongers.

At the same time, the localists are hostile toward the pan-democracy camp, as they believed the pan-democrats' cosmopolitanism as unrealistic and their wish for a democratic China will sacrifice at Hong Kong interest. They are also dissatisfied with the believed ineffectiveness of the pan-democrats as the opposition party for the past 20 years. On the other hand, the right-wing populist tendency of the localist movements was condemned as "xenophobic" and "nativist" by mainstream activists and the government. The conflict between the left and the right wings of the movement resulted in great disunity of the whole democratic cause.

In the 2012 Legislative Council election, some pan-democrat candidates, including Claudia Mo of the Civic Party and Gary Fan of the Neo Democrats, both claiming to be moderates, expressed some localist ideas and raised concerns on tourist and immigration policies. For that, they set up a parliamentary group called HK First. Legislator Wong Yuk-man, a strong critic of the Communist Party and former member of People Power and his protégé Wong Yeung-tat, leader of the activist group Civic Passion, also switched to the localist cause soon after the election.

Criticising the annual vigil to commemorate the Tiananmen Square crackdown held by the Hong Kong Alliance in Support of Patriotic Democratic Movements in China for having a Chinese nationalistic theme, Civic Passion organised its alternative 4 June rally in Tsim Sha Tsui. The alternative event attracted 200 people in 2013 and 7,000 in 2014, compared with 180,000 and 150,000 respectively for the main event.

In mid 2012, the government's decision to implement Moral and National Education was criticised for applauding the communist and nationalist positions of the Chinese government and attacking Western-style democracy. A student-led group, Scholarism, headed by Joshua Wong, occupied the Hong Kong government headquarters, drawing a massive protester turnout and succeeding in securing a government back down.

"Hong Kong Nationalism"
The Undergrad, the official publication of the Hong Kong University Students' Union (HKUSU), from February 2014, published a few articles on the subject of a Hong Kong nation. Articles entitled “The Hong Kong nation deciding its own fate” and “Democracy and Independence for Hong Kong” raise the localist discourse to the level of political autonomy for Hong Kong, which in effect would be tantamount to Hong Kong independence. Chief Executive Leung Chun-ying used his 2015 New Year's policy address to direct harsh criticism at the magazine for promoting Hong Kong independence, fanning both the debate and sales of the book Hong Kong Nationalism which featured the articles.

Umbrella Revolution 

In 2013, legal scholar Benny Tai, considered a moderate democrat, advocated a civil disobedience plan to pressure Beijing to implement genuine universal suffrage in Hong Kong. The plan matured into Occupy Central. The right-wing localists were largely against it, mainly because they believed it was a plot by pan-democrats to hijack popular support. Student activists from Scholarism and Hong Kong Federation of Students (HKFS) emerged as the leaders in the Occupy protests. They posted the slogan "self-determination of our fate" outside the government headquarters. Right-wing localists, many of whom criticised the occupation plan before, participated in the protests and advocated a more "militant" approach as opposed to the strict principles of non-violence advocated by the three promoters of Occupy Central and the student activists. They gathered at the Mong Kok site, as opposed to the main site in Admiralty which was led by the HKFS. They blamed the HKFS leadership for failure of the protest.

2019–20 protests

Localism in Popular Culture

Identity 

Political localism and cultural localism coexist in Hong Kong. Political localism is an idea that is the opposite of centralizing government power, and that advocates for deliberative democracies. Cultural localism focuses on the popular culture side, including languages, daily lives, films and books. It associated with Hong Kong's typical lifestyle. Moreover, localist “Hongkonger” ideas include the mindset of separating Hong Kong people from mainland-Chinese orientated identity.

Cultural localism does not reject all the identity from China. It does not resist traditional Chinese cultures, such as traditional customs and festivals. But it rejects the present Chinese identity and contemporary Chinese culture.

Cantonese 

People in Hong Kong frequently debate about Cantonese and Mandarin. Localists focus on protecting Cantonese. The dichotomy between Mandarin and Cantonese is very important for “Hongkonger” as identity confirmation. “Hongkongers” refuse to use simplified characters which are used in mainland China, and they use traditional characters in their daily lives. Linguistics scholars have promoted the Cantonese written form and mentioned that “the rise of written form Cantonese to greater awareness of one's Cantonese identity, as opposed to Chinese sense of self”. Although more Hong Kong people have been learning and speaking Mandarin since the 1980s, the younger generation consciously avoids using Mandarin in their daily lives to resist “mainlandization”. While localists promote Cantonese and speak Cantonese, the Hong Kong government continues to promote and popularize Mandarin. For example, Peter Lam, the head of the Hong Kong Tourism Board, suggested to popularize Mandarin by starting teaching Mandarin from Kindergarten, as Cantonese separated Hong Kong from mainland China.

In 2014, the Education Bureau stated that Cantonese was “a Chinese dialect that is not an official language.” Many Hong Kong people do not think that Cantonese is only a dialect, but a proper form of Chinese. The Bureau angered many Hongkongers, who complained this action was tried to degrade Cantonese. Finally, the Bureau was forced to apologize and deleted the phrase.

Films 

Stakeholders hold polarized opinions about localist films. Some localist films were censored by the Hong Kong government and China, and cannot be broadcast in main cinemas.

Ten Years (2015)

Ten Years was produced by five localist directors. The film depicts controversies between the government and the localist. It nominated to be one of the best films at the 35th Hong Kong Film Awards Presentation Ceremony.  Chinese government has several comments about the film. For example, Global Times, a tabloid owned by the Chinese Communist Party, mentioned the film was ridiculous and promoted desperation in Hong Kong. It called Ten Years the “virus of mind ”. An editorial from the Chinese government also criticized some “opposition figures” in Hong Kong, who used the film to threaten China. As a result, China decided to stop the live broadcast of the ceremony, because the film is politically sensitive. Ta Kung Pao, a pro-Beijing newspaper, called Ten Years a “pro-independence film”. One of the film directors responded that he does not see Ten Years as promoting a political agenda, but imagining the future of Hong Kong and reflecting Hong Kong's political reality.

Not only China, but some theatres in Hong Kong also refused to broadcast Ten Years. For example, Broadway Circuit, one of the main theaters chain in Hong Kong, refused to broadcast even though Ten Years grossed over 6 million Hong Kong dollars. Broadway Circuit explained that there were “too many films” screening at that time. A professor in Hong Kong Academy commented that he had never heard the films that sell all the tickets pull out from the cinema, and stated that no exhibitor will admit censorship or direct pressure from China. As a result, Ten Years broadcast on private screens at universities and rented places.

Lost in the Fumes'' (2017)Lost in the Fumes is a documentary about Hong Kong activist Edward Leung. In 2020, Ying e Chi, an organization for independent filmmakers, asked to broadcast Lost in the Fumes, but the request was rejected by the Wong Tai Sin District Office. The Office replied that the film advocated for and praised an individual. According to Manual on the Use of the District Council Funds, “projects that may give undue credit or publicity to an individual, a commercial film, a political party or association may not be supported”.“Manual on the Use of District Council Funds.” Home Affairs Department. January 2020. Ying E Chi reaffirmed the film was a documentary that never praising and advocating for an individual, and Ying e Chi suspected the act from Wong Tai Sin District Office was political censorship.

In 2021, the Student Union of Hong Kong University broadcast Lost in the Fumes, but Hong Kong University suspected that the film may violate National Security Law. The Student Union reaffirmed that their aim is to let students understand the Hong Kong local history, and said they would continue the broadcasting and hoped that the university would stop restricting political freedom.

Self Identity of Hong Kong Citizens
Over the past 23 years, Hong Kong citizens' self-identity has evolved. In 2008, most Hong Kong citizens responded and identified themselves as Chinese, but by 2019, most people in Hong Kong regard themselves as Hongkongers. This change contributed to the 2014 Hong Kong protests and the 2019–2020 Hong Kong protests and led to friction between the Pro-democracy camp and Pro-Beijing camp. Hong Kong as an international city was formed by people with different nationalities. Foreigners who are not nationals of the People's Republic of China can become permanent residents of Hong Kong. Whether by personal identification or official definition, becoming Chinese is not a necessary condition for becoming a Hong Kong citizen. According to the mid-year population of 2016, 568,395 Hong Kong citizens do not hold Chinese nationality. In this situation, not all Hong Kong citizens are Chinese.

The self-identity of Hong Kong citizens changes through time. Major events like the 2008 Beijing Olympics and the 2019–2020 Hong Kong protests were key factors that changed citizens’ perception of their ethnic identity. The research was conducted by the Hong Kong University Public Opinion Program (HKUPOP). HKUPOP was established in June 1991 to collect and study public opinion on topics that could be of interest to academics, journalists, policy-makers, and the general public. HKUPOP was at first under the Social Sciences Research Centre, a unit under the Faculty of Social Sciences of the University of Hong Kong. It was transferred to the Journalism and Media Studies Centre at the University of Hong Kong in May 2000. In January 2002, it was transferred back to the Faculty of Social Sciences in the University of Hong Kong. On 23 April 2019, the Public Opinion Programme of the University of Hong Kong (HKUPOP) has announced that it will spin off from the university and continue its work independently, as a separate body. HKUPOP was closed on 30 June 2019. Its Director, Dr. Robert Chung, set up a new organization, the Hong Kong Public Opinion Research Institute, and continued its polls and studies. The research results on citizen's categorical ethnic identity were quoted by media from different political spectrum, including the Hong Kong Free Press and MingPao.

The most well-known research by the HKUPOP is about people's ethnic identity. The research was first started in August 1997, right after the Handover of Hong Kong. The HKUPOP team conducted telephone surveys by interviewers to target Cantonese speakers in Hong Kong age 18 or above. The sample size of these surveys was more than 500 successful cases each time. Since May 2000, the number has been increased to more than 1000 and weighted according to the gender-age distribution of the Hong Kong population. The research focuses on the categorical ethnic identity of “Chinese” and “Hongkonger,” but these identities can exist non-exclusively. Thus the survey provides 7 options for respondents: Hongkonger (香港人), Hongkonger in China (中國的香港人), Chinese in Hong Kong (香港的中國人), Chinese (中國人), Hongkonger and Hongkonger in China (香港人+中國的香港人), Chinese and Chinese in Hong Kong (中國人+香港的中國人) and mixed identity (混合身分).

In the June 2008 survey, during the 2008 Sichuan earthquake and the 2008 Beijing Olympics, only 18.1% of respondents identified themselves as a “Hongkonger,” while 38.6% of respondents identified themselves as “Chinese,” which was the highest point throughout the 22 years survey. In the last survey conducted in June 2019, when the Anti-Extradition Law Amendment Bill Movement first started, research results show that only 10.8% of respondents identified themselves as “Chinese,” and 52.9% of respondents identified themselves as a “Hongkonger,” which reached the highest point since 1997. Research on citizens’ categorical ethnic identity from 1997 to 2019. Demonstrates a significant increase in the categories of “Hongkonger” and “Hongkonger and Hongkonger in China,” whereas the number of identifying themselves as “Chinese,” “Chinese in Hong Kong,” “Chinese and Chinese in Hong Kong” and “mixed identity” had decreased.

Post-occupy localist movements
After the Occupy movement, several organisations named "Umbrella organisations" by the media were set up, in which many of them carried certain degree of localist discourses, notably Youngspiration and Hong Kong Indigenous. Youngspiration took part in the 2015 District Council election with many other newcoming "Umbrella soldiers" and eventually won one seat out of nine candidates. Hong Kong Indigenous is notable for its protest style, in which it calls for a "militant" approach with "some kind of clash", as opposed to pan-democrats' "gentle approach" of non-violent civil disobedience.

The Hong Kong Independence Party was formed in April 2015 advocating an independent Hong Kong within the British Commonwealth.

HKFS disaffiliation campaign
The localists' disaffection toward the HKFS resulted in a great split in the student federation. The localists launched a campaign quitting the HKFS. By the end of 2015, four of the eight student unions consisting the federation, the Hong Kong University Students' Union (HKUSU), the Hong Kong Polytechnic University Students' Union (HKPUSU), the Hong Kong Baptist University Students' Union (HKBUSU) and the City University of Hong Kong Students' Union (CityUSU), broke up with the HKFS.

Anti-parallel trading protests

The localists including Hong Kong Indigenous and Civic Passion also mobilised on the Internet and launched several "Liberate campaigns" in districts such as Tuen Mun on 8 February, Sha Tin on 15 February and Yuen Long on 1 March where parallel traders were active. Protesters were not only against the parallel traders, but also the overcrowded environment in Hong Kong caused by the multi-entry permits issued to mainland tourists. They scolded the mainland tourists, aggressively picketed the alleged shoppersand and clashed with the police, in which many of them turned violent. After the third demonstration, the central government said it would restrict Shenzhen residents to one visit a week.

Siu Yau-wai case
In July 2015, localists including Hong Kong Indigenous and Youngspiration marched to the Immigration Department to demand deportation of an undocumented 12-year-old Mainland boy Siu Yau-wai, who lived in Hong Kong for nine years without identification. Siu, whose parents are alive and well in mainland China, stayed with his grandparents after having overstayed his two-way permit nine years ago. Pro-Beijing Federation of Trade Unions lawmaker Chan Yuen-han advised and assisted the boy and his grandmother to obtain a temporary ID and pleaded for compassion from the local community. Some called on the authorities to consider the case on a humanitarian basis and grant Siu permanent citizenship while many others, afraid that the case would open the floodgates to appeals from other illegal immigrants, asked for the boy to be repatriated. The boy later returned to his parents in mainland China.

Mong Kok unrest

In February 2016 during the Chinese New Year, Hong Kong Indigenous called for action online to shield the street hawkers, who sold Hong Kong street food in which they saw as part of the Hong Kong culture, from government health department's crackdown. The protest escalated to violent clashes between the police and the protesters. The protesters threw glass bottles, bricks, flower pots and trash bins toward the police and set fires in the streets which the government condemned as riots. The Chinese Foreign Ministry for the first time labelled the involved localists as "separatists", claiming that "the riot [was] plotted mainly by local radical separatist organisation."

Hong Kong Indigenous nominated Edward Leung, who would later rise to prominence by his involvement in the Mong Kok clashes and arrest by police, in the 2016 New Territories East by-election. Localist groups and figures who campaigned for Leung included Youngspiration, Civic Passion, Chin Wan and Wong Yuk-man. Leung finished in third place, with 15 per cent of the vote, behind the moderate pan-democrat Civic Party Alvin Yeung with 37 per cent and pro-Beijing DAB's Holden Chow with 34 per cent. Leung claimed localism had gained a foothold as the third most important power in local politics, standing side by side with the pan-democracy and pro-Beijing camps. The better-than-expected result was considered to further boost the localists' morale and their ambition of running in the September general election.

Hong Kong independence

The University of Hong Kong student magazine Undergrad published an article in March 2016 headed “Hong Kong Youth's Declaration” arguing for Hong Kong independence on expiry of the Sino-British Joint Declaration in 2047. It demands a democratic government be set up after 2047 and for the public to draw up the Hong Kong constitution. It also denounces the Hong Kong government for becoming a “puppet” of the Communist Party, “weakening” the city's autonomy. Chief Executive Leung Chun-ying dismissed the claim, stating that “Hong Kong has been a part of China since ancient times, and this is a fact that will not change after 2047.” University of Hong Kong council chairman Arthur Li described the idea of independence as nonsense, saying that “I don't think any wise person would listen.”

Hong Kong National Party, the first party openly advocates for Hong Kong independence and a Republic of Hong Kong established on 28 March 2016, drew attacks from the Beijing and SAR governments. The State Council's Hong Kong and Macau Affairs Office issued a statement through the official Xinhua News Agency on 30 March 2016 condemning the party: "The action to establish a pro-independence organisation by an extremely small group of people in Hong Kong has harmed the country's sovereignty, security, endangered the prosperity and stability of Hong Kong, and the core interests of Hong Kong... It is firmly opposed by all Chinese people, including some seven million Hong Kong people. It is also a serious violation of the country's constitution, Hong Kong's Basic Law and the relevant existing laws." The Hong Kong government issued a statement after the formation of the party, stating that "any suggestion that Hong Kong should be independent or any movement to advocate such 'independence' is against the Basic Law, and will undermine the stability and prosperity of Hong Kong and impair the interest of the general public... The SAR Government will take action according to the law."

The Alliance of Resuming British Sovereignty over Hong Kong and Independence is the second political group to advocate a breakaway from China. Established on 26 June 2016, it aims to gain independence as the ultimate goal, but seeks to return to British rule as a transitional phase.

It is reported that about a dozen Hong Kong universities displayed large banners calling for the city's independence on China's National Day (October 1) of 2016.

Electoral ventures and disqualifications
New Territories East by-election

In the 2015 District Council elections, a couple of localist candidates were elected including Kwong Po-yin of Youngspiration, Wong Chi-ken of Kowloon East Community and nonpartisan Clarisse Yeung.

The Legislative Council by-election in New Territories East on 28 February 2016 was a milestone of the localist movements, as it was the first attempt for them to contest for the Legislative Council under localist banner. Youngspiration was initially considering fielding a candidate and called for a primary with the pan-democratic Civic Party. It later dropped out due to the lack of time for holding a primary.

Edward Leung of Hong Kong Indigenous received a better-than expected result in the New Territories East by-election in February 2016 by taking more than 66,000 votes and gaining about 15 percent of the total votes. After the election, Leung claimed localism had gained a foothold as the third most important power in local politics, standing side by side with the pan-democracy and pro-Beijing camps.

2016 Legislative Council election

A day after the 2016 New Territories East by-election, three localist groups, Wong Yuk-man's Proletariat Political Institute, Wong Yeung-tat's Civic Passion and Chin Wan's Hong Kong Resurgence Order, announced to run in the September Legislative Council election under the alliance "CP–PPI–HKRO". On 10 April 2016. six localist groups Youngspiration, Kowloon East Community, Tin Shui Wai New Force, Cheung Sha Wan Community Establishment Power, Tsz Wan Shan Constructive Power and Tuen Mun Community, formed an electoral alliance under the name "ALLinHK" planned to field candidates in four of the five geographical constituencies with the agenda to put forward a referendum on Hong Kong's self-determination, while Hong Kong Indigenous and another new pro-independence Hong Kong National Party also stated that they will run in the upcoming election. Demosisto, a left-leaning political party formed by Umbrella Revolution leaders Joshua Wong, Oscar Lai and Nathan Law was also formed on the same day. The political party aimed to field candidates in the upcoming election with the platform of "self-determination" of Hong Kong future. It allied with activists such as Eddie Chu and Lau Siu-lai.

On 14 July 2016, the Electoral Affairs Commission (EAC) announced its plan to require all candidates to sign an additional "confirmation form" in the nomination to declare their understanding of Hong Kong being an inalienable part of China as stipulated in the Basic Law, in response to many potential localist candidates advocating or promoting Hong Kong independence. Although Civic Passion's Alvin Cheng agreed to sign the confirmation form, other candidates including Hong Kong Indigenous' Edward Leung and Hong Kong National Party's Chan Ho-tin refused to sign. Leung subsequently signed the form the court refused to immediately hear the judicial review.

After the end of the nomination period, six localist candidates received emails from the EAC which said their nominations were "invalidated", which included Chan Ho-tin, Democratic Progressive Party's Yeung Ke-cheong, Nationalist Hong Kong's Nakade Hitsujiko, Conservative Party's Alice Lai Yee-man, Hong Kong Indigenous' Edward Leung and independent Chan Kwok-keung. New Territories East constituency returning officer Cora Ho Lai-sheung rejected Leung's nomination on the basis that she did not trust Leung "genuinely changed his previous stance for independence." Despite their localist stance, all five tickets of the CP–PPI–HKRO alliance and four tickets of the ALLinHK were validated under the Electoral Affairs Commission's (EAC) new election measure. Youngspiration's convenor Baggio Leung who initially intended to run in Hong Kong Island and stood in New Territories West finally submitted his nomination to stand in New Territories East in the wake of the EAC's measure, which he claimed to be a "substitute candidate" in case Edward Leung was disqualified in the constituency.

The localists scored a resounding victory in the election, winning six seats and securing nearly 20 per cent of the vote. Occupy student leader Nathan Law of the Demosisto became the youngest ever candidate to be elected, Polytechnic University lecturer Lau Siu-lai and Eddie Chu, were returned in the geographical constituencies Eddie Chu, a social activist and environmentalist, bagged more than 84,000 votes, the highest votes received in the geographical constituencies, without any party backing in New Territories West. After the election victory, Chu explained his slogan of "democratic self-determination" was different from the "militant" localists' slogan of "national self-determination" as he disagreed with the notion of nationalism. For the "militant" faction, Baggio Leung, leader of Youngspiration won in New Territories East after his ally, Hong Kong Indigenous' Edward Leung was barred from poll while Yau Wai-ching won last seat in Kowloon West by about 400 votes at the expense of veteran Wong Yuk-man of the Proletariat Political Institute. Wong's ally, Civic Passion leader Wong Yeung-tat also lost in his second bid in Kowloon East. Only Cheng Chung-tai from the electoral alliance won a seat in the New Territories West.

Legco oath-taking controversy

In October 2016, the two Youngspiration legislators Baggio Leung and Yau Wai-ching were sued by the government for their oath-taking. The two claimed that "As a member of the Legislative Council, I shall pay earnest efforts in keeping guard over the interests of the Hong Kong nation," displayed a "Hong Kong is not China" banner, inserted their own words into the oaths and mispronounced "People's Republic of China" as "people's re-fucking of Chee-na" when they took the oath. In November, the spokesman of the Hong Kong and Macau Affairs Office stated that "[Beijing] will absolutely neither permit anyone advocating secession in Hong Kong nor allow any pro-independence activists to enter a government institution," after the National People's Congress Standing Committee (NPCSC) interpret the Article 104 of the Basic Law of Hong Kong which aimed to disqualify the two legislators. On 14 July 2017, the court unseated four more pro-democracy legislators, including Demosisto's Nathan Law and Lau Siu-lai who ran their campaign with "self-determination" slogan.

Localist figures and organisations

Politicians and office holders
 Cheng Chung-tai
 Eddie Chu
 Gary Fan
 Lau Siu-lai
 Ventus Lau
 Nathan Law
 Baggio Leung
 Claudia Mo
 Wong Yuk-man
 Yau Wai-ching

Intellectuals, writers and activists
 Chan Ho-tin
 Alvin Cheng
 Chin Wan
 Chapman To
 Cheng Lap
 Hung Ho-fung
 Edward Leung
 Ray Wong
 Roy Tam
 Kengo Ip
 Chip Tsao
 Wong Yeung-tat

Magazines and media
 Channel i Local Press MyRadio Passion Times The Undergrad''

Organisations
 Alliance of Resuming British Sovereignty over Hong Kong and Independence
 Christians to the World
 Civic Passion
 Conservative Party
 CUHK Local Society
 Democracy Groundwork
 Democratic Progressive Party of Hong Kong
 Demosistō
 Green Sense
 HK First
 Hong Kong National Front
 Hong Kong Autonomy Movement
 Hong Kong Civile Party
 Hong Kong Independence Party
 Hong Kong Indigenous
 Hong Kong Localism Power
 Hong Kong National Party
 Hong Kong Resurgence Order
 Hong Konger Front
 Hongkongers Priority
 Kowloon East Community
 Land Justice League
 Liber Research Community
 Nationalist Hong Kong
 Neo Democrats
 North District Parallel Imports Concern Group
 Proletariat Political Institute
 Sha Tin Community Network
 Studentlocalism
 Tai Po Sunwalker
 Tin Shui Wai New Force
 Tsz Wan Shan Constructive Power
 Youngspiration

See also
 Localist groups (Hong Kong)
 Hong Kong independence
 Opposition to immigration
 Taiwan localization movement
 Cultural conservatism

Other ideologies in Hong Kong
 Conservatism in Hong Kong
 Liberalism in Hong Kong
 Socialism in Hong Kong

References

 
Anti-Chinese sentiment in Asia
Anti-immigration politics in Hong Kong
Identity politics in Hong Kong
Politics of Hong Kong
Right-wing populism in Asia
Stateless nationalism in Asia
Political history of Hong Kong
2010s in Hong Kong